Coila Creek is a stream in the U.S. state of Mississippi.

Coila Creek is a name derived from the Choctaw language purported to mean either "dead panther" or "panther comes there". A variant name is "Coa-i-ille Creek".

References

Rivers of Mississippi
Rivers of Carroll County, Mississippi
Mississippi placenames of Native American origin